Henry's World is a Canadian animated children's series produced for Canada's Family Channel by Cuppa Coffee Animation,  Alliance Atlantis Communications, with TV-Loonland AG also producing the first. It was first aired from 2002 to 2005, with 26 episodes altogether.  The series follows Henry Wiggins, a boy who has an extraordinary ability to make his wishes come true when eating his mother's mushy carrots.  This was the first stop-motion animated series to be entirely produced in Canada.

Plot
Henry Wiggins (voiced by Samantha Reynolds) is the third oldest of five children (himself, two older brothers and two younger sisters).  When he was just five years old, Henry discovered that eating his mother's mushy carrots gave him the ability to make wishes come true.  Once eaten, Henry can make one wish come true.  However, being only eight years old, his unusual wishes are often played out with unexpected consequences and his insatiable curiosity invariably spells disaster, but Henry also learns some of life's lessons along the way.

Henry shares his secret and misadventures with his best friend Fraidy Begonia (voiced by Tracey Moore), his faithful pet dog Margaret (voiced by Julie Lemieux), and Doris (voiced by Fiona Reid), a dragon who lives in Henry's closet.  Other characters in the show include Henry's Uncle Neptune (voiced by Colin Fox), Ms. Pierre (also voiced by Fiona Reid), Henry's teacher and the anti-hero Darwin (also voiced by Julie Lemieux), an overweight bully who sometimes teases and picks on Henry.

Episodes

Season One (2002)
 Pet Dinosaur
Pirate Out of Water
 My Two Front Teeth
Goragh
 Triple Trouble
Tunnelling To China
 Is Anybody Out There?
Secrets
 My Gorilla Is Bigger Then Yours
Whither Weather
 Sugar Overload
Lady Luck
 Henry the Magnificent
Jump to It
 Hitch In Time
Doris' Day
 Love Is In The Air
Who's Afraid Of The Dark
 Middle Child Blues
Silver Tongue
 Carrots Away
Price of Lame
 Costume Capers
Fire's Out
 X-Ray X-mas
Darwin For A Day

Season Two (2005)
 Super Hero Henry
Treasure Hunt
 Henry's New Shoes
Stuck on You
 Henry's Massive Munchies
Plant Life
 Home Run Henry
Henry the Brave Knight
 Henry and Henrietta
Stage Fright
 Happy Birthday Henry
Henry's Big Story
 Henry's Little Adventure
Henry the Cook
 The Chestervale Challenge
Fishing Friends
 King of Chestervale
Henry the Halloween Wizard
 Kung Fu Henry
Henry the Cowboy
 Now You See Me
Talk To The Animals
 Dad For A Day
Haircut Hoopla 
 Henry's Christmas Gifts

Release
Henry's World was also seen on ABC Kids in Australia (21 October 2002 - 31 October 2013) and V-me (Spanish dub only) in the USA.  The first season of the show is available on a two-disc DVD set from Echo Bridge Entertainment.

References

External links
 
 Henry's World Season 1 at Telefilm Canada
 Henry's World Season 2 at Telefilm Canada

Family Channel (Canadian TV network) original programming
2000s Canadian animated television series
2002 Canadian television series debuts
2005 Canadian television series endings
2000s Canadian children's television series
2002 German television series debuts
2005 German television series endings
2000s preschool education television series
Animated television series about children
Canadian children's animated fantasy television series
Canadian stop-motion animated television series
English-language television shows
German children's animated fantasy television series
Television series by Cuppa Coffee Studios
Television series by DHX Media
Television series by Alliance Atlantis
Television shows set in Ontario